Flat Jason is one of the Jason Islands in the north west Falkland Islands. In Spanish, it is considered one of "Islas las Llaves" (eastern, Seal Rocks and North Fur Island),; such a distinction does not exist in English between the two groups of the islands.

References

Jason Islands